Shock to the System  or variants may refer to:

Literature, film, and television
 A Shock to the System (novel), a 1984 novel by Simon Brett
 Shock to the System, a 1995 mystery novel by Richard Stevenson
 A Shock to the System (1990 film), an adaptation of Brett's novel, directed by Jan Egleson
 Shock to the System (2006 film), an adaptation of Stevenson's novel, directed by Ron Oliver
 "Shock to the System" (Grey's Anatomy), a television episode
 "Shock to the System" (Static Shock), a television episode

Music
 "Shock to the System" (Billy Idol song), 1993
 "Shock to the System" (Gemma Hayes song), 2011
 "Shock to the System", a song by Sara Jorge from R3MIX, 2005
 "Shock to the System", a song by Yes from Union, 1991

See also
System Shock (disambiguation)